South Pier is located in Penzance, Cornwall, England. The original pier predated 1512, but was rebuilt in the 18th century. The pier is a Grade II* listed building.

History
The original South Pier was built before 1512, the year that the current harbour in Penzance was built. The pier was rebuilt in the 18th century, with a small extension built between 1785 and 1787. It was one of the largest maritime engineering projects in 18th century Cornwall. The pier was further extended in 1812, at a cost of £6,900, and later between 1853 and 1855, it was extended again. At this time, a lighthouse was added to the end of the pier, 
to help navigation for boats around the nearby Mount's Bay.

South Pier is built of granite and elvan. In 2003, South Pier became a listed building. In 2010, its status was upgraded from Grade II to Grade II*, which affected proposed redevelopment work on the harbour in order to provide a ferry link from there to the Isles of Scilly.

References

External links
 Historic England

Grade II* listed buildings in Cornwall
Grade II* listed piers
Buildings and structures in Penzance
Piers in Cornwall